The Texas Transportation Museum (TTM) is a transportation museum located in San Antonio, Texas.

It was created in 1964 to help preserve artifacts and information about San Antonio's transportation history. TTM operates as much of its collection as possible, including many railroad vehicles on its own heritage railroad, the Longhorn and Western Railroad, multiple model train layouts, and many antique automobiles. TTM's goal is to provide an educational and entertaining experience which interprets how developments in transportation technology shaped and continue to impact daily life.

The museum was originally located at the Pearl Brewing Company in Downtown San Antonio and had used the tracks of the Texas Transportation Company.

The museum hosts three major events annually, an Easter egg hunt in April for Easter, "Spook-Track-Ula" in October for Halloween, and "Santa's Railroad Wonderland" in December for Christmas.

Different areas, including a remodeled caboose, picnic tables, children's play area and a large outdoor pavilion can be rented for group parties.  The children's play area includes a playscape consisting of a wooden steam engine and a metal scale-model diesel engine. 

TTM is a registered 501(c)(3) charitable organization.

Longhorn and Western Railroad
The Longhorn and Western Railroad is the Texas Transportation Museum's standard gauge heritage railroad that operates on its property with no connection to the general rail system. Visitors can ride the full sized diesel-powered train every hour on the half hour on Saturdays and Sundays, and Fridays during the summer or holidays. A steam day is held once a month where visitors can ride behind the museum's standard gauge steam locomotive.

Rolling stock preserved on the L&W

Operating
US Army 1954 Baldwin RS-4-TC 1A Switcher #4035
US Air Force 1942 GE 45-ton switcher #7071
Comal Power Plant 1925 Baldwin 0-4-0T #1
Missouri Pacific Railroad Flat car #50043
Missouri Pacific Railroad Caboose #13083
US Marine Corps Fairmont motor car #256260

Static display
Moscow, Camden and San Augustine Railroad 1911 Baldwin 2-8-0 Steam locomotive #6
Atchison, Topeka and Santa Fe Railway Pullman business car #404
Pullman Company (operated by Missouri–Kansas–Texas Railroad) 1924 Pullman McKeever sleeper car 
Union Pacific Railroad Caboose #25275
Missouri Pacific Railroad Caboose #11919 - Awaiting restoration
Missouri Pacific Railroad Caboose #13430 - Converted into a birthday party room
Miscellaneous railroad speeders

Antique vehicles

Fire apparatus
1898 American LaFrance steam pumper
1924 Buffalo Type 50 fire engine
1947 Mack Type 85

Tractors
1939 Case
1941 Cletrac DG-5
1948 Ford 8N
1946 John Deere Model H

Cars and trucks
1929 Ford Model AA
1931 Ford Model A Tudor
1924 Ford Model TT
1903 Oldsmobile Curved Dash
1918 Oldsmobile Speedster

Carriages
1900 Doctor’s Carriage
1898 Victorian Brougham
1903 Studebaker

Model railroad displays
HO scale layout operated by the Alamo Model Railroad Engineers (AMRE)
G gauge outdoor layout operated by the San Antonio Garden Railroad Engineers Society (SAGRES)
N scale layout operated by the San Antonio N-Trak Association (SANTRAK)
O scale layout operated by TTM volunteers
Z scale layout

Gallery

References

Automobile museums in Texas
Railroad museums in Texas
Museums in San Antonio
Museums established in 1964
Model railway shows and exhibitions